Ramulus braggi, is a species of phasmid or stick insect. It is found in Sri Lanka.

References

Phasmatodea
Insects of Sri Lanka
Endemic fauna of Sri Lanka
Insects described in 2002